Megalospora is a genus of lichen-forming fungi in the family Megalosporaceae.

Taxonomy
The genus was circumscribed in 1843 by Prussian botanist Franz Meyen, with Megalospora sulphurata assigned as the type, and at that time, only species. The genus was then largely defined on the basis of the structure of the apothecia.

In 2012, Gintaras Kantvilas and H. Thorsten Lumbsch synonymized the genus Austroblastenia (which contained two species) with Megalospora, based on both morphology and molecular phylogeny.

Description
Megalospora is characterised by its large, bicellar ascospores. Other features include the crustose thallus, the lecideine apothecia, and the presence of oil droplets in the hymenium. The photobiont partner is a member of the green algal genus Dictyochloropsis. Megalospora species are usually distinguished based on the type of ascospore, thallus chemistry, and the presence or absence of reproductive propagules such as isidia and soralia.

Species
, Species Fungorum accepts 22 species of Megalospora.
Megalospora albomarginata  – Java
Megalospora atrorubricans 
Megalospora australiensis 
Megalospora austropacifica  – Fiji
Megalospora caraibica  – Jamaica
Megalospora clandestina  – Tasmania
Megalospora disjuncta  – New Zealand
Megalospora flavoexcipulata  – Java
Megalospora galactocarpa 
Megalospora galapagoensis 
Megalospora imshaugii  – Jamaica
Megalospora javanica  – Java
Megalospora lopadioides  – Tasmania
Megalospora melanodermia 
Megalospora occidentalis  – Western Australia
Megalospora pauciseptata 
Megalospora porphyritis 
Megalospora pulverata  – Tasmania
Megalospora pupa 
Megalospora queenslandica 
Megalospora reniformis 
Megalospora subtuberculosa 
Megalospora sulphurata  – widespread
Megalospora tuberculosa

References

Teloschistales
Lichen genera
Teloschistales genera
Taxa described in 1843
Taxa named by Franz Meyen